Barryville-New Jersey is an area with enhanced services within the Canadian local service district of the parish of Alnwick in Northumberland County, New Brunswick; it is sometimes erroneously cited as being an LSD in its own right.

History

Notable people

See also
List of communities in New Brunswick

References

Communities in Northumberland County, New Brunswick
Designated places in New Brunswick
Local service districts of Northumberland County, New Brunswick